Matthew Roszak (born 1972/1973) is an American billionaire venture capitalist and cryptocurrency investor. Roszak is the co-founder and chairman of Bloq, a blockchain startup company. As of May 2022, his net worth was estimated at US$1.4 billion.

Roszak graduated from Lake Forest College in 1995.

In 2006, while working as a venture capitalist at SilkRoad Equity, he settled U.S. Securities and Exchange Commission (SEC) charges of insider trading in Blue Rhino, a propane tank exchange business.

In January 2021, Roszak had an estimated net worth of US$1.2 billion.

Roszak is married, and lives in Chicago, Illinois.

References

Living people
American billionaires
Lake Forest College alumni
American venture capitalists
People convicted of insider trading
Year of birth missing (living people)